Kelly Clark (born 10 June 1994) is a Scottish footballer who plays as a defender for Celtic.

Career

At the age of 15, Clark debuted for Scottish second tier side Forfar Farmington. Before the 2013 season, she signed for Celtic in the Scottish top flight, helping them win the 2022 Scottish Women's Cup and 2021 Scottish Women's Premier League Cup.

References

External links
 

1994 births
Living people
Women's association football defenders
Celtic F.C. Women players
Forfar Farmington F.C. players
Scotland women's international footballers
Scottish women's footballers
Scottish Women's Premier League players